Peltospira delicata is a species of sea snail, a marine gastropod mollusk in the family Peltospiridae.

Description

Distribution
This species occurs in the Pacific Ocean off Mexico.

References

 Williams S.T., Karube S. & Ozawa T. (2008) Molecular systematics of Vetigastropoda: Trochidae, Turbinidae and Trochoidea redefined. Zoologica Scripta 37: 483–506.

External links
 Warén A. & Bouchet P. (2001). Gastropoda and Monoplacophora from hydrothermal vents and seeps new taxa and records. The Veliger, 44(2): 116-231

Peltospiridae
Gastropods described in 1989